The Witness is a 2018 South Korean crime thriller film directed by Jo Kyu-jang. It stars Lee Sung-min, Kim Sang-ho, Jin Kyung and Kwak Si-yang. It was released theatrically in South Korea on August 15, 2018. The film is about a man who witnesses a murder and takes no action on what he has seen.

Plot
One night at his apartment, Sang-Hoon hears a woman's scream. He looks outside his apartment and sees Tae-Ho hitting a woman with a hammer. Sang-Hoon and Tae-Ho then make direct eye contact. Sang-Hoon does not call the police. The next day, that woman is found dead. Detective Jae-Yeob investigates the case. Sang-Hoon is still terrified and does not tell Detective Jae-Yeob about what he witnessed. Soon, another resident who witnessed the same murder is killed by Tae-Ho. Sang-Hoon tries to protect himself and his family from the murderer.

Cast
Lee Sung-min as Sang-Hoon
Kim Sang-ho as Jae-Yeob
Jin Kyung as Soo-jin
Kwak Si-yang as Tae-ho
Son Jong-hak as Squad chief Choi
Lee Jae-woo as Detective Jo
Kim Sung-kyun as Hyung-Gyoon
Park Bom as Eun-ji
Kim Nam-hee as Kim Dae-ri
Shin Seung-hwan as Park Sang-Tae
Hwang Young-hee as Women's society president
Jung Jae-kwang as Guy at the store
Woo Ji-hyun as Newspaper delivery guy	
Lee Min-woong as Woo-min
Bae Jung-hwa as Seo-yeon
Yeon Je-wook as Cola
Kim Hak-sun as Team leader

Production 
Principal photography began on September 23, 2017. Production ended in Paju of Gyeonggi Province on December 20, 2017.

Release 
The film released theatrically in South Korea on August 15, 2018, with age 15-rating.
The Witness was released on VOD by Next Entertainment World on September 8, 2018.

Reception 
The film attracted more than 360,000 moviegoers on its first day of release and finished third, behind The Spy Gone North and Along with the Gods: The Last 49 Days. However, the film managed to top the box office on its second day of release. According to the Korean Film Council, the film surpassed one million moviegoers in four days.

On August 24, 2018, the film reached its break-even point, with more than 1.8 million moviegoers having watched the film. After finishing first during its first weekend, the film dropped to second place during its second weekend, trailing behind On Your Wedding Day. The film had a 45% drop in gross during its second weekend, earning  from 433,006 attendance. During its third weekend, the film dropped to fifth place by attracted 102,080 moviegoers with  gross, 77% lower gross compared to second weekend. The film dropped to ninth place during its fourth weekend.

As of September 10, the film attracted 2,515,758 admissions with  gross.

Awards and nominations

References

External links
 
 
 The Witness at Naver

2018 films
2018 crime thriller films
South Korean crime thriller films
South Korean serial killer films
Next Entertainment World films
2010s South Korean films